Patricia Resnick is an American screenwriter and producer, known for her work on films like 9 to 5, Straight Talk, and Maxie. She has also worked as a consulting producer or co-producer on TV series like Mad Men and Better Things.

Biography 
She met Robert Altman while studying at the University of Southern California and started her career working with him on the film 3 Women. She collaborated several times with Altman, beginning with developing 3 Women. She later appeared as herself in one of his films, The Player. One of her biggest successes came in 9 to 5: Resnick wrote the first draft drama, and Jane Fonda cast herself, Lily Tomlin, and Dolly Parton in the leads, the last in her first film role.

Resnick served as a writer on a number of television series, and as a supervising producer on the final season of Mad Men. She got a Tony nomination for the musical of 9 to 5, written with Dolly Parton ran on Broadway in 2009 and was recently a huge hit on the West End in London. She is currently working on a sequel to 9 to 5 alongside Rashida Jones.

Selected filmography (as writer)

Film
 Straight Talk (1992)
 Second Sight (1989)
 Maxie (1985)
 9 to 5 (1980)
 Quintet (1979)
 A Wedding (1978)
 3 Women (1977) (uncredited)

TV
 Better Things (2020) (series) (1 episode)
 Tales of the City (2019) (series) (1 episode)
 The Arrangement (2017) (series) (2 episodes)
 Recovery Road (2016) (series) (3 episodes)
 Perfect Match (2015) (TV movie)
 Midnight Masquerade (2015) (TV movie)
 Olivia (2009) (series) (15 episodes)
 The Battle of Mary Kay (2002) (TV movie)
 Jenifer (2001) (TV movie)
 Sex, Lies & Obsession (2001) (TV movie)
 The Expendables (2000) (TV movie)
 Price of a Broken Heart (1999) (TV movie)
 Faerie Tale Theatre (1983) (series) (1 episode)
 Cher… and Other Fantasies (1979) (TV movie)
 Visions (1979) (series) (1 episode)
 Cher… (1978) (TV special)

References

External links
 

American screenwriters
Screenwriters from Florida
American women screenwriters
American television writers
1953 births
Living people
21st-century American women